Giraavaru may refer to:
 The Giraavaru people
 Giraavaru (Kaafu Atoll) (Maldives)
 Giraavaru (Raa Atoll) (Maldives)